Coleophora cteis is a moth of the family Coleophoridae that is endemic to Mongolia.

References

External links

cteis
Moths of Asia
Endemic fauna of Mongolia
Moths described in 1975